GM Korea Company is the South Korean subsidiary of multinational corporation General Motors. GMK is also the third largest automobile manufacturer in South Korea. GM Korea's roots go back to the former Daewoo Motors vehicle brand which was split from its parent company, Daewoo Group, in 2002. It has three manufacturing facilities in South Korea. In addition, GM Korea provides region and brand-specific vehicle assembly kits for assembly by GM affiliates in the United States, Brazil, China, Colombia, Uzbekistan and Mexico. Exports to Australia and India ended when GM announced in February 2020 of withdrawing from all right-hand-drive markets worldwide. 

In 2008, GM Korea built more than 1.9 million vehicles, including CKD products. It currently produces vehicles and kits for Chevrolet and Buick that are offered in more than 150 markets with right-hand-rule of road. It produced vehicles and kits for Holden in Australia until the brand's demise in 2020. GM Korea also has design, engineering, research & development facilities that are involved in development for various GM products, above all small-size cars.

History

Predecessors 

GM Korea's roots go back to the remnants of the Korean War and Shinjin Motors, which launched its business by rebuilding scrapped US military vehicles. Shinjin Motor was first established as National Motor in 1937 in Bupyeong-gu, Incheon, Japanese Korea. After changing its name to Saenara Motor in 1962, Saenara Motor was bought by Shinjin Industrial in 1965, which changed its name to Shinjin Motor after establishing a partnership with Toyota. After Toyota's withdrawal in 1972 (to keep doing business with China, which would not trade with companies who engaged in South Korea or Taiwan), Shinjin Motor changed its name to GM Korea (GMK) in 1972 with General Motors purchasing a 50% stake in the company from Toyota in 1972; however GMK was renamed again in 1976 to Saehan Motors.

Korea Development Bank (KDB), the company's creditor, took over management in 1976 as the company found itself unable to cope with competition from Hyundai and Kia. After the Daewoo Group gained control in 1982, the name was changed once more to Daewoo Motor. In the early 1990s the company started to expand heavily throughout the world. Until 1996 all Daewoo cars were based on GM-designed models. After the 1997 Asian financial crisis reached South Korea, Daewoo took over the troubled SUV manufacturer SsangYong in 1998, but ran into financial trouble and was forced to sell the company off in 2001 to GM affiliate SAIC Motor.

Formation: GM Daewoo 
In 2001, General Motors bought most of Daewoo Motor's assets to form "GM Daewoo Auto & Technology". The new company started operations on October 17, 2002, with GM and its partners Suzuki and SAIC holding a stake of 66.7% with investments of US$400 million. The GM holding was formally purchased by GM Holden Ltd which holds a seat on the board and is legally responsible for GM Daewoo. The remaining equity stake of 33.3% was held by Korea Development Bank and several other Korean creditors with investments of US$197 million. The deal did not include 15 plants, including Daewoo's oldest plant in Bupyeong-gu which is now operated under the name Incheon Motor Company as a supplier to GM Daewoo. In 2004, Tata Motors purchased Daewoo Truck, which had been spun out of bankrupt Daewoo Motor Co. in 2002. In February 2005, GM invested US$49 million to raise its share in the company to 48.2%. In 2010, General Motors owned 82.9%, SAIC 9.9%, and the Daewoo Motor Creditors Committee the remaining 7.2%.

On November 25, 2003, the design center was relocated to the new two-story building at the Bupyeong-gu headquarters. The first car to be produced under the GM Daewoo nameplate was the 2002 Daewoo Lacetti, replacing the Nubira. This car was developed in South Korea under the Daewoo Motor era, but it gradually became a GM world car, sold under many different marques all around the globe. After a few years without any new cars to present, in 2005, GM Daewoo introduced the Holden-based Statesman luxury car replacing the discontinued Daewoo Chairman. The third generation of Matiz was introduced, refreshed by the GM Daewoo design team, and an evolution of the four-door Kalos appeared: the Gentra.

In early 2006, GM Daewoo presented Tosca, the replacement of the Magnus. GM Daewoo's official press releases says that Tosca is an acronym for "Tomorrow Standard Car". The end of the same year, GM Daewoo introduced the Winstorm, its first proper sport utility vehicle (SUV), which was, as the Lacetti, sold worldwide under different brands and names including Opel Antara, Chevrolet Captiva and Holden Captiva, and previously Saturn Vue before the demise of the Saturn brand in 2010. It featured a common rail Diesel engine for the first time in a Daewoo vehicle, in addition to regular four and six cylinder gasoline engines. The diesel engine design was licensed from the Italian engine maker VM Motori.

2007 saw the introduction of the Lacetti and Kalos hatchback facelift's wagon version, becoming the Gentra X. For 2008, GM Daewoo introduced the first Korean-branded roadster: the G2X sports car, a badge-engineered Pontiac Solstice/Saturn Sky which was based on the GM Kappa platform, and started to sell the Opel Antara under the name of Winstorm MaXX. The Statesman flagship was also replaced by the new Veritas which is now based on the Holden Caprice V.

Late 2008 and early 2009 were a major period for GM Daewoo with the introduction of the all-new Lacetti Premiere, which is based on the Chevrolet Cruze, a very important compact car for GM divisions worldwide. The newly rechristened third generation of the Matiz was added to the range in 2009 as the Chevrolet Spark.

2010 saw introduction of the Chevrolet Orlando and Alpheon, a local version of the Buick LaCrosse.

Establishment of GM Korea

On January 20, 2011, General Motors announced that GM Daewoo would be renamed GM Korea "to reflect [Daewoo's] heightened status in [the] global operations of GM", effective March 2011. Most of the remaining Daewoo vehicles were rebadged as Chevrolets, although the Damas/Lobo microtrucks were sold without a brand name since 2011.

GM's luxury division Cadillac entered South Korea in 1996 and, with a record sales year of 28000 units in 2017, South Korea became the 5th largest market for Cadillac worldwide (after China, the United States, Canada and the Middle East).

In 2011 the Daewoo Tosca was replaced by a locally built version of the Chevrolet Malibu.

More recently, the low annual incomes a result of lower levels of sales, led to closing the non-profitable factories of the GM Korea unit. These plant closures provoked protests among the workers of the Bupyeong-gu and Incheon GM Korea plants, when the unionised workers tried to prevent the closure of operations, and lead a strike against the government to protect their jobs.

GM withdrawal from Europe and crisis 
Starting from 2014, GM halted sales of all Chevrolet-branded cars in Europe, India, East and South Africa (most of which had up to then been manufactured completely or in part by GM Korea). In 2017, General Motors finalized its move out of the European market by selling the Opel/Vauxhall subsidiary to Groupe PSA (now called the Stellantis in 2021). As a result, GM no longer has any official activities in Europe. This caused closure of the South Korean GM Gunsan Plant due to low productivity.

This news was followed by the further announcement from GM (Detroit Headquarters) on 16 February 2020 that "as part of a strategy to exit markets that don't produce adequate returns on investments" it was exiting of all right-hand drive markets worldwide, including Australia, New Zealand and Thailand.
This announcement also had the knock-on effect of the final termination of the 160-year old Holden automotive brand in Australia and New Zealand, as well as ending production of the Chevrolet Colorado and Trailblazer in Thailand.

Due to this, GM Korea's Bupyeong 2 plant was closed due to reduced productivity. The Spark, Trax and Malibu will be discontinued in August 2022.

Manufacturing facilities
South Korea
 Bupyeong-gu: vehicle assembly and gasoline/LPG engine manufacturing (production capacity: est. 440,000/year)
 Changwon: vehicle assembly and gasoline/LPG engine manufacturing (production capacity: est. 210,000/year)
 Boryeong: transmission and engine components manufacturing

Former manufacturing facilities
South Korea
 Gunsan: vehicle assembly and diesel engine manufacturing (production capacity: est. 260,000/year). This plant closed on May 31, 2018. The factory was later merged with Chinese electric commercial vehicles company Yuan Cheng Auto, in cooperation with Myoung Shin. The company plans to produce CKD-made electric trucks for the South Korean market.

Vietnam
 Hanoi: GM Vietnam vehicle assembly (production capacity: est. 11,000/year) acquired by VinFast in 2018.

Slogans
 2011~2012: "Chevrolet, is the car"
 2012~2015: "LOVE. LIFE." (Chevrolet)
 2015~present: "Find New Roads" (Chevrolet)
 2018: "다시 힘차게 달린다" + "Find New Roads" (Chevrolet)

Model range

Current locally manufactured models 

Buick Encore GX (export)
Chevrolet Trax (export)
Chevrolet Trailblazer

Current imported models

Cadillac (Cadillac Korea) 

Cadillac CT4
Cadillac CT5
Cadillac Escalade
Cadillac XT4
Cadillac XT5
Cadillac XT6

Chevrolet 

Chevrolet Bolt EV
Chevrolet Bolt EUV
Chevrolet Colorado
Chevrolet Equinox
Chevrolet Tahoe
Chevrolet Traverse

GMC 
GMC Sierra Denali

Discontinued models

Alpheon
Buick Encore (export)
Cadillac CT6
Chevrolet Aveo/Sonic
Chevrolet Camaro SS
Chevrolet Captiva
Chevrolet Corvette C6
Chevrolet Cruze
Chevrolet Impala
Chevrolet Malibu
Chevrolet Optra
Chevrolet Orlando
Chevrolet Spark
Chevrolet Volt
Opel Karl/Vauxhall Viva
Damas/Labo

See also

 Daewoo Bus 
 Daewoo Motor Sales
 List of Daewoo models
 List of Korean car makers

Notes

References

External links

 

 
Vehicle manufacturing companies established in 2002
Car manufacturers of South Korea
Truck manufacturers of South Korea
South Korea
South Korean brands
2002 establishments in Korea
South Korean subsidiaries of foreign companies